The American Rivers Conference (A-R-C) is an NCAA Division III athletic conference.  From 1927 until August 9, 2018, it was known officially as the Iowa Intercollegiate Athletic Conference (IIAC) and commonly as the Iowa Conference.

History
The A-R-C dates back to December 8, 1922, when representatives from 12 colleges formed the Iowa Intercollegiate Athletic Association. Charter members were Buena Vista College, Central University of Iowa, Ellsworth College, Iowa Wesleyan College, Luther College, Morningside College, Parsons College, St. Ambrose College, Simpson College, Upper Iowa University, Western Union College and Penn College. Des Moines University was voted into the conference at that meeting as well.

The first Conference constitution was published in January 1923. Also that year, Judge Hubert Utterback of Des Moines, Iowa was named the first conference commissioner and Iowa Teachers (now known as the University of Northern Iowa) was accepted as a member. Columbia College (now known as Loras College) was admitted in 1926. Ellsworth left the Conference in 1927. That spring, the Conference's name was changed to the "Iowa Intercollegiate Athletic Conference." After a three-year ban, athletics were reinstated at the University of Dubuque in 1928–29, and it joined the conference in 1929. Wartburg College was admitted to the conference in 1936, beginning competition the following year. Morningside dropped out in 1936 because of inactivity. William Penn was suspended from the Conference in 1949 for using ineligible players. The school was back in the Conference in 1951, though it did not compete in football until later. In 1951, St. Ambrose and Loras dropped from football competition.

The Iowa Conference reorganized in 1953, effective with the 1954–55 school year. Nine schools remained in the Conference: Buena Vista, Central, Dubuque, Iowa Wesleyan, Luther, Parsons, Simpson, Upper Iowa and Wartburg. William Penn was re-admitted to the Conference in 1960, effective in the spring of 1962. Parsons left the Conference around 1963, while Iowa Wesleyan left effective June 1, 1965. Loras re-joined the Conference in 1986, increasing the Conference membership to nine schools, which continued until 1997 when Coe and Cornell left the Midwest Conference to join the IIAC. The Conference was at 11 schools until its 80th Anniversary year (2001–02) when William Penn decided to leave and switch its affiliation from the NCAA to the NAIA. The IIAC became a nine- school conference when Upper Iowa reclassified to NCAA Division II prior to the start of the 2003–04 academic year and fell back to eight schools with Cornell's return to the Midwest Conference following the 2011–12 academic year.

The conference expanded beyond the borders of Iowa in 2016 with the addition of Nebraska Wesleyan University. On August 9, 2018, the league changed its name to the American Rivers Conference to reflect its current makeup.

Chronological timeline
 1922 - On December 8, 1922, the American Rivers Conference was founded as the Iowa Intercollegiate Athletic Association (IIAA). Charter members included Buena Vista College (now Buena Vista University), Central University of Iowa (now Central College), Des Moines University, Ellsworth College (now Ellsworth Community College), Iowa Wesleyan College (now Iowa Wesleyan University), Luther College, Morningside College, Parsons College, St. Ambrose College (now St. Ambrose University), Simpson College, Upper Iowa College (now Upper Iowa University), Western Union College (later Westmar University) and Penn College (now William Penn University), effective beginning the 1922-23 academic year.
 1923 - Iowa State Teachers College (now the University of Northern Iowa) joined the IIAA, effective in the 1923-24 academic year.
 1926 - Columbia College of Iowa joined the IIAA, effective in the 1926-27 academic year.
 1927 - Ellsworth left the IIAA, effective after the 1926-27 academic year.
 1927 - The IIAA was renamed as the Iowa Intercollegiate Athletic Conference (IIAC) during the spring season, effective beginning the 1927-28 academic year.
 1929 - Des Moines U. left the IIAC as the school announced to close, effective after the 1928-29 academic year.
 1929 - The University of Dubuque joined the IIAC, effective in the 1929-30 academic year.
 1935 - Northern Iowa left the IIAC fully align with the North Central Intercollegiate Athletic Conference (NCIAC), effective after the 1934-35 academic year.
 1936 - Morningside left the IIAC to fully align with the NCIAC, effective after the 1935-36 academic year.
 1936 - Wartburg College joined the IIAC, effective beginning the 1937-38 academic year.
 1949 - William Penn was suspended for two seasons by the IIAC, effective after the 1948-49 academic year.
 1951 - William Penn was re-instated back to the IIAC, effective in the 1951-52 academic year.
 1953 - Westmar left the IIAC, effective after the 1952-53 academic year.
 1954 - Loras, St. Ambrose and William Penn left the IIAC, effective after the 1953-54 academic year.
 1960 - William Penn re-joined back to the IIAC, effective beginning the 1962-63 academic year.
 1965 - Iowa Wesleyan left the IIAC, effective after the 1964-65 academic year.
 1986 - Loras re-joined back to the IIAC, effective in the 1986-87 academic year.
 1997 - Coe College and Cornell College joined the IIAC, effective in the 1997-98 academic year.
 2001 - William Penn left the IIAC for a second time to join the National Association of Intercollegiate Athletics (NAIA) and the Midwest Collegiate Conference (MCC), effective after the 2000-01 academic year.
 2003 - Upper Iowa left the IIAC to join the Division II ranks of the National Collegiate Athletic Association (NCAA) as an NCAA D-II Independent (which would later join the Northern Sun Intercollegiate Conference (NSIC), effective beginning the 2006-07 academic year), effective after the 2002-03 academic year.
 2012 - Cornell left the IIAC to re-join back to the Midwest Conference (MWC), effective after the 2011-12 academic year.
 2016 - Nebraska Wesleyan University joined the IIAC, effective in the 2016-17 academic year.
 2018 - On August 9, 2018, the IIAC was rebranded as the American Rivers Conference (A-R-C), effective in the 2018-19 academic year.

Member schools

Current members

The ARC currently has nine full members, all are private schools:

Notes

Former members
The ARC had 11 former full members, all but one were private schools:

Notes

Membership timeline

Sports
Member teams field men's and women's teams in cross country, basketball, track and field, golf, soccer, tennis. Men's teams are field for baseball, football and wrestling.  Women's teams are field for softball and volleyball.

The men's and women's swimming and diving championships is an annual invitation held by the conference in which all of the teams that sponsor the sport attend.

Men's sponsored sports by school

 Dubuque also sponsors a men's lacrosse team.
 Loras also sponsors a men's volleyball team in the College Conference of Illinois and Wisconsin.

Women's sponsored sports by school

References

External links
 

 
College sports in Iowa
College sports in Nebraska